{{Infobox person
| name               = Pritish Nandy

|image = 

| caption = Pritish Nandy (left), Ambika Soni (right), IFFI (2010)
| birth_name         = Pritish Nandy
| birth_date         = 
| birth_place        = Bhagalpur, Bihar, India
| occupation         = Poet, Painter, Journalist, Politician
| works              = Calcutta if You Must Exile Me”
| awards             = Padma Shri; EM Forster Literary Award, International Humanitarian Award at the Genesis Awards, US; Bangladesh Liberation War Award
| spouse             = 
| children           = Kushan Nandy, Rangita Pritish-Nandy, Ishita Pritish Nandy
| relatives          = Ashis Nandy (brother) 
}}
Pritish Nandy (born 15 January 1951) is an Indian poet, painter, journalist, parliamentarian, media and television personality, animal activist and maker of films, TV and streaming content. He was a parliamentarian in the Rajya Sabha from Maharashtra,  elected on a ticket from the Shiv Sena. He is the author of forty books of poetry in English and has translated poems by other writers from Bengali, Urdu and Punjabi into English as well as a new version of the Isha Upanishad. Apart from these, he has authored books of stories and non fiction as well as three books of translations of classical love poetry from Sanskrit. He was Publishing Director of The Times of India Group and Editor of The Illustrated Weekly of India, The Independent, and Filmfare in the 1980s, all simultaneously. He has held six exhibitions of his paintings and calligraphy. He founded Pritish Nandy Communications Ltd, the content company, in 1993. He also founded People for Animals, India's first animal rights NGO which is currently run by co-founder Maneka Gandhi as chairperson.

Early life
Pritish Nandy was born in Bhagalpur in the state of Bihar in eastern India to a Bengali Christian family. He is the son of Satish Chandra Nandy and Prafulla Nalini Nandy, and brother of Ashis Nandy and Manish Nandy. His daughters Rangita Pritish-Nandy (born 1978) and Ishita Pritish-Nandy (born 1980) are film producers, creators and show runners and his son Kushan Nandy(born 1972) is a film producer, writer and director. Pritish Nandy was educated at La Martiniere College and, briefly, at Presidency College in Kolkata, where he spent the first 28 years of his life. Nandy's mother was a teacher at La Martiniere Calcutta and subsequently became the school's first Indian vice principal.

Literary career
Pritish Nandy's first book of poems Of Gods and Olives was published in 1967. Three further volumes followed in the 1960s and a further 14 volumes were published in the 1970s. During the seventies Nandy edited and published a poetry magazine called Dialogue which published many of India's finest poets in English and other languages, in translation. Dialogue also published over forty books of poems, of first time poets as well as famous poets. It became an iconic platform for contemporary Indian poetry, in English and in translation. In July 1981 Nandy was nominated as a Poet Laureate by the World Academy of Arts and Culture at the Fifth World Congress of Poets in San Francisco.
 Nandy's poem Calcutta If You Must Exile Me is considered a pioneering classic in modern Indian literature.

The Government of India conferred on him the Padma Shri in 1977 for his contribution to Indian literature. He wrote a new book of poems called “Again” in 2010 after a long hiatus and then, “Stuck on 1/Forty in 2012”. In 2014, his version of the Isha Upanishad was published. His Collected Poems are being published by Seagull Books.

Journalistic career
He was publishing director of The Times of India between 1982 and 1991. He was also managing editor of the group and editor and publisher of The Illustrated Weekly of India during its most successful decade. He was also editor and publisher of ‘’The Independent’’, a newspaper launched by the same group and ‘’Filmfare’’ the popular magazine.

Nandy left The Times of India group to start his own media company Pritish Nandy Communications which was founded in 1993. He is currently chairman of Pritish Nandy Communications Ltd, popularly known as PNC and well known for its films, TV shows and streamed content.

He is also a columnist with The Times of India, Dainik Bhaskar, Divya Bhaskar and Sangbad Pratidin. His regular column appears in ‘’Mumbai Mirror’’ and his blog on Times Online.  Nandy was one of the first internet evangelists in India and opened India's first cyber café in 1996 at Hotel Leela Kempinski in Mumbai.

Political career
Pritish Nandy was elected to the Rajya Sabha representing Maharashtra, the upper house of the Indian parliament, in July 1998. He was elected on a Shiv Sena ticket. He was a member of parliament for six years and was on a number of committees including the National Committee to Celebrate 50 years of Independence, the Parliamentary Committee for Defence, the Parliamentary Committee for Communications, the Parliamentary Committee for Foreign Affairs.

Nandy headed the Expert Committee for upgradation of the International Film Festival of India set up by the Ministry of Information and Broadcasting and submitted its findings to the Ministry of Information & Broadcasting in 2011.

Humanitarian work

Pritish Nandy has worked for many causes but is best known as the founder of People for Animals, India's largest animal protection NGO that Maneka Gandhi, its co-founder, heads and runs as chairperson. He received the International Humanitarian Award at the Genesis Awards in Los Angeles in 2012, supported by the Humane Society of the United States, the largest animal protection body in the US.

On 28 November 2012 Pritish Nandy founded World Compassion Day, a platform for promoting the values of compassion and ahimsa, and the first lecture on the occasion was delivered in Mumbai by the 14th Dalai Lama who spoke on the ethical treatment of animals.

Film and television
Nandy founded Pritish Nandy Communications in 1993 and remains its non-executive chairman and creative mentor. The company's first programme was a chat show titled The Pritish Nandy Show which aired on Doordarshan, India's public broadcasting channel. This was the first signature show on Indian television. This was followed by Fiscal Fitness: The Pritish Nandy Business Show, India's first weekly business show, on Zee TV.

Nandy has presented over 500 news and current affairs shows on Doordarshan, Zee TV and Sony TV.

He has made 24 films over the years, which have won numerous awards and much critical acclaim. His company Pritish Nandy Communications spearheaded the multiplex film genre in India.

The very successful Original series made by his company, ‘’Four More Shots Please!’’ (for Amazon and streaming on Prime Video) won an International Emmy nomination in 2020 and several other awards across the world. The Amazon India Creative Head called it their most watched show out of India in a quote to the New York Times which carried a major story on the show and its impact.

‘’Modern Love Mumbai’’, his most recent Original show (2022) has been critically acclaimed and opened to a record breaking viewership.

 Television content 
 India 98 : The Choice – A live election debate show on Doordarshan. Moderated by Pritish Nandy and Nalini Singh. Directed by Pankuj Parashar. Won the RAPA Award.
 The Pritish Nandy Show – A signature chat show on Doordarshan and Zee TV Network. Hosted by Pritish Nandy. Directed by Umesh Agarwal. The show was later repeated on Doordarshan Metro, Jain, Sun and Udaya TV. Nominated for the Screen Videocon Awards.
 Maneka's Ark – An environment chat show on Star Plus and Doordarshan. Hosted by Maneka Gandhi. Directed by Amar Sharma and Rima Chhib.
 Mr Gaayab — A comedy serial based on the invisible man on Zee TV Network. Starring Joy Sengupta. Directed by Kushan Nandy.
 Face Off – An election chat show on Doordarshan. Hosted by Pritish Nandy and Javed Akhtar. Directed by Pankuj Parashar.
 Ek Raja Ek Rani – A romantic comedy serial on Doordarshan and Zee TV Network. Starring Shekhar Suman and Bhairavi Raichura. Directed by Kushan Nandy. Won the Aashirwad Award for Best Actor in 1999.
 Raj Kahani – A costume drama on Doordarshan. Starring R Madhavan in a double role. Directed by Kushan Nandy.
 Khwahish – A behind-the-scenes look at the big bad world of fashion on Sony Television. Starring Annie Thomas. Directed by Manu Gargi.
 Yudh – A daily soap opera on Doordarshan, Sun, Udaya and Jain TV. Starring Mahavir Bhullar and Lalit Tiwari. Directed by Kushan Nandy.
 Sanjog – A daily show based on the story of an ideal Indian family. This serial crossed 250 episodes on Doordarshan National. Starring Amar Talwar, Anjana Mumtaz, Aamir Ali Malik, etc. Directed by Ajeet Kumar.
 India-The Awakening – A daily show profiling achievers on Doordarshan. Hosted by Pritish Nandy. Directed by different directors.
 Hungama Unlimited – A sitcom that lists the best of Hindi films and pop music. Also a countdown show to hit the number one position on Doordarshan Metro in terms of viewership ratings. Directed by different directors.
 Heads & Tails – An animal rights show on Doordarshan. Hosted by Maneka Gandhi. Directed by Umesh Agarwal. Won the RAPA Award and was nominated for the Screen Videocon and Pinnacle Awards.
 Entertainment Now – A daily entertainment news show on Doordarshan. Hosted by Sagarika Sonie. Directed by Subir Dhar and Amitabh Tripathi.
 Chup Bas Lakshya – PNC's foray into regional Marathi television on Doordarshan Sahyadri. Starring Laxmikant Berde. Directed by Bhaskar Jadhav.
 New Horizons – An alternative lifestyle show on Doordarshan and Zee TV Network. Hosted by Maneka Gandhi. Won a Screen Videocon Award.
 Fiscal Fitness: The Pritish Nandy Business Show — A business show on Zee TV Network. Directed by Umesh Agarwal.
 Four More Shots Please! – An Amazon Original on Prime Video. Created by Rangita Pritish-Nandy. Produced by Pritish Nandy. Won an International Emmy nomination.
 ‘’Rat-a-tat’’ in ‘’Unpaused’’ - An Amazon Original anthology on Prime Video. Produced by Pritish Nandy and Rangita Pritish Nandy
 ‘’Modern Love Mumbai’’ - An Amazon Original on Prime Video featuring six films. Produced by Pritish Nandy.

 Films 

Awards
Padma Shri 1977 received from the President of India
Karmaveer Puraskaar 2008 
International Humanitarian Award at the Genesis Awards 2012 in Hollywood, organised by the Humane Society of the United States.
Bangladesh Liberation War Award received from the Prime Minister of Bangladesh

Selected works

Books of poems
 Of Gods & Olives (Calcutta/ Mexico City, 1967) 32pp, Writers' Workshop 
 On Either Side of Arrogance (Calcutta, 1968) 32pp, Writers' Workshop
 I Hand You in Turn My Nebbuk Wreath (Calcutta, 1968) 16pp, Dialogue/ Writers' Workshop 
 From the Outer Bank of the Brahmaputra (New York, 1969) 38pp, New Rivers Press
 Masks to be Interpreted in Terms of Messages (Calcutta, 1971) 48pp, Writers' Workshop 
 Madness is the Second Stroke (Calcutta, 1972) 56pp, Dialogue 
 The Poetry of Pritish Nandy: Collected Poems (New Delhi, 1973)
 Riding the Midnight River: Selected Poems (New Delhi/ London, 1974) 144pp, Arnold Heinemann 
 Dhritarashtra Downtown: Zero (Calcutta, 1974)
 Lonesong Street (Calcutta, 1975) 32pp, Poets Press
 In Secret Anarchy (Calcutta, 1976) 38pp, United Writers
 The Nowhere Man (Calcutta, 1976) 32pp, Arnold Heinemann 
 A Stranger Called I (Calcutta, 1976), 48pp, Kavita/Arnold Heinemann 
 Tonight, This Savage Rite/ With Kamala Das (New Delhi, 1977) 55pp, Arnold Heinemann
 Anywhere is Another Place (Calcutta, 1979) 48pp, Arnold Heinemann 
 Pritish Nandy 30 (Calcutta, 1980) 30pp, Kavita/Arnold Heinemann 
 The Rainbow Last Night (New Delhi, 1981) 48pp, Arnold Heinemann 
 Again (New Delhi, 2010) 104pp, Rupa Publications
 Stuck on 1/Forty (New Delhi, 2012) 124pp, Amaryllis
 Tonight, This Savage Rite (New Delhi, 2014) 124pp HarperCollins

Book of Interviews
 Peerless Minds: A Celebration Interviews with Thirty Incredible Indians (New Delhi, 2019) 400pp, HarperCollins, also a Special Collectors Edition limited to 500 copies

Verse play
 Rites for a Plebeian Statue (Calcutta, 1970), Writers Workshop, India.

Short stories
 Some Friends (New Delhi, 1979), Arnold Heinemann

Translations
 The Complete Poems of Samar Sen (Calcutta, 1970) 192pp, Writers Workshop
 Subhas Mukhopadhyay: Poet of the People (Calcutta, 1970) 24pp, Dialogue 
 Poems from Bangladesh (Calcutta, 1971) Dialogue
 The Prose Poems of Lokenath Bhattacharya (Calcutta, 1971) Dialogue 
 Bangladesh: Voice of a New Nation (Calcutta/ London/ New York, 1972)
 Shesh Lekha: The Last Poems of Rabindranath Tagore (Calcutta, 1973) Dialogue 
 Modern Bengali Poetry (Chicago, 1974) Mahfil, University of Chicago
 The Flaming Giraffe: Poems by Sunil Gangopadhyay (Calcutta, 1975)Dialogue 
 Songs of Mirabai with drawings by Rabin Mondal (New Delhi, 1975) Vikas Publishing
 The Poetry of Kaifi Azmi (Calcutta, 1975) 32pp, Poets Press/Arnold Heinemann
 Krishna, Krishna: Poems by Kabir (New Delhi, 1976) Vikas Publishing
 The Lord is my Shepherd (New Delhi, 1982) Vikas Publishing
 Untamed Heart: Poems by Bhartrhari with drawings by Samir Mondal (New Delhi, 1994) Rupa Publications 
 Unchained Melody: Poems by Amaru with drawings by Samir Mondal (New Delhi, 1994) Rupa Publications 
 Careless Whispers: Sanskrit Love Poetry with drawings by M.F Husain (New Delhi, 1994) Rupa Publications 
 The Isha Upanishad: illustrated by Sunandini Banerjee (Calcutta, 2013) Seagull Books

Poetry recordings
 Lonesong Street, with Ananda Shankar (EMI, 1977)
 Hazaaron Khwaishein Aisi, with Shantanu Moitra (Virgin, 2004)

Bengali translation
 Pritish Nandyr Kobita translated by Amarendra Chakravarti (Calcutta, 1975)
 Pritish Nandyr Kobita translated by Shakti Chattopadhyay (Calcutta, 1978)

Anthologies edited
 Indian Poetry in English: 1947–1972 (Calcutta, 1972) Oxford & IBH
 Indian Poetry in English Today (New Delhi, 1973)
 Modern Indian Poetry (New Delhi/ London, 1974)
 Modern Indian Love Poetry (New Delhi, 1974) Vikas Publishing
 Modern Indian Love Stories (New Delhi, 1974) Vikas Publishing
 Strangertime (New Delhi, 1976) Sterling Publishers

 Appearances in the following poetry Anthologies 
 The Golden Treasure of Writers Workshop Poetry'' (2008) ed. by Rubana Huq and published by Writers Workshop, Calcutta

References

External links
Pritish Nandy Communications
Writer's Workshop India

Indian male poets
Poets from Maharashtra
Indian newspaper editors
Presidency University, Kolkata alumni
University of Calcutta alumni
La Martiniere Calcutta alumni
1951 births
Living people
Rajya Sabha members from Maharashtra
People from Bhagalpur
English-language poets from India
Bengali people
Recipients of the Padma Shri in literature & education
20th-century Indian poets
20th-century Indian male writers